Päivi Simukka (born 21 January 1966) is a Finnish former cross-country skier. She competed in the women's 30 kilometre freestyle event at the 1992 Winter Olympics.

Cross-country skiing results
All results are sourced from the International Ski Federation (FIS).

Olympic Games

World Cup

Season standings

References

External links
 

1966 births
Living people
Finnish female cross-country skiers
Olympic cross-country skiers of Finland
Cross-country skiers at the 1992 Winter Olympics
People from Kerava
Sportspeople from Uusimaa
20th-century Finnish women